The Voyage of Understanding (officially the Tour of the President to Alaska) was a trans-continental tour of the Western United States taken by President Warren G. Harding in the summer of 1923. It marked the first time a sitting president visited Alaska and Canada. The tour took place during the final weeks of Harding's life, as he fell ill during the tour and died.

Harding wished to spend time outside of Washington, D.C. following a number of scandals that had begun to cast a shadow over his presidency, most notably the Teapot Dome scandal. He chose to embark on a tour to improve public relations in anticipation of his reelection campaign in 1924. President Harding, along with Florence Harding and a large company of officials, began the tour across the United States aboard the Superb.

On July 5, Harding and his companions arrived in Tacoma, Washington and boarded the USS Henderson on a voyage to Alaska. During his time in Alaska, he visited Mount McKinley National Park and what is now the University of Alaska Fairbanks. He also attended the completion of the Alaska Railroad in Nenana, where he drove in the final spike. As he concluded the Alaska portion of his tour in late July, Harding began to complain of cramps, indigestion, fever and shortness of breath. He died in San Francisco on August 2. The original cause of death was stated to be a stroke, but it is now believed that he died of a heart attack.

The Harding Railroad Car was listed on the National Register of Historic Places in 1978, and the Superb was listed in 1998.

Itinerary

References 

1923 in the United States
June 1923 events
July 1923 events
August 1923 events
Presidency of Warren G. Harding